The  is a Japanese broadcast orchestra based in Tokyo. The orchestra gives concerts in several venues, including the NHK Hall, Suntory Hall, and the Tokyo Opera City Concert Hall.

History
The orchestra began as the New Symphony Orchestra on October 5, 1926, and was the country's first professional symphony orchestra. Later, it changed its name to the Japan Symphony Orchestra. In 1951, after receiving financial support from NHK, the orchestra took its current name.

The most recent conductor with the title of music director of the orchestra was Vladimir Ashkenazy, from 2004 to 2007.  Ashkenazy now has the title of conductor laureate.  Charles Dutoit, the orchestra's music director from 1998 to 2003, is now its music director emeritus. Wolfgang Sawallisch, honorary conductor from 1967 to 1994, held the title of honorary conductor laureate until his death.  The orchestra's current permanent conductors are Yuzo Toyama, since 1979, and Tadaaki Otaka, since 2010.  Herbert Blomstedt holds the title of honorary conductor, since 1986 and the title of honorary conductor laureate, since 2016.  André Previn had the title of honorary guest conductor from 2012 until his death in 2019.

In June 2012, the orchestra named Paavo Järvi as its next chief conductor, as of the 2015–2016 season, with an initial contract of 3 years.  Järvi's most recent contract extension with the NHK Symphony, announced in November 2019, is through August 2022, at which time he is scheduled to stand down from the orchestra.

Fabio Luisi first guest-conducted the orchestra in July 2001.  In April 2021, the orchestra announced the appointment of Luisi as its next chief conductor, effective September 2022, with an initial contract of 3 years.

Permanent Conductors and Music Directors
 Hidemaro Konoye (January 1926 – February 1935)
 Josef König (April 1927 – April 1929)
 Nicolai Schifferblatt (July 1929 – July 1936)
 Joseph Rosenstock (August 1936 – September 1946, full-time conductor; March 1956 – March 1957, Principal Conductor)
 Hisatada Otaka (April 1942 – February 1951†, full-time conductor)
 Kazuo Yamada (April 1942 – July 1951, full-time conductor)
 Shin'ichi Takata (April 1944 – May 1951, full-time conductor)
 Kurt Wöss (September 1951 – August 1954, Principal Conductor)
 Niklaus Aeschbacher (August 1954 – March 1956, Principal Conductor)
 Wilhelm Loibner (March 1957 – February 1959, Principal Conductor)
 Wilhelm Schüchter (February 1959 – March 1962, Principal Conductor)
 Alexander Rumpf (August 1964 – July 1965, Principal Conductor)
 Hiroyuki Iwaki (February 1969 – June 2006†, Permanent Conductor)
 Tadashi Mori (February 1979 – May 1987†, Permanent Conductor)
 Yuzo Toyama (February 1979–present, Permanent Conductor)
 Hiroshi Wakasugi (April 1995 – July 2009†, Permanent Conductor)
 Charles Dutoit (September 1996 – August 1998, Principal Conductor; September 1998 – August 2003, music director) 
 Vladimir Ashkenazy (September 2004 – August 2007, music director)
 Tadaaki Otaka, CBE (January 2010 – present, Permanent Conductor)
 Paavo Järvi, (October 2016 – August 2022, Chief Conductor)
 Fabio Luisi, (September 2022-, Chief Conductor)

Honorary Conductors and other titled conductors
 Joseph Rosenstock (August 1951 – October 1985†)
 Joseph Keilberth (January 1967 – July 1968†)
 Lovro von Matačić (January 1967 – January 1985†)
 Wolfgang Sawallisch (January 1967 – October 1994; November 1994–February 2013†, Honorary Conductor Laureate)
 Otmar Suitner (January 1973 – January 2010†)
 Horst Stein (March 1975 – July 2008†)
 Herbert Blomstedt (January 1986 – present)
 Charles Dutoit (September 2003 – present, Music Director Emeritus)
 Vladimir Ashkenazy (September 2007 – present, Conductor Laureate)
 André Previn (September 2012 – February 2019†, Honorary Guest Conductor)

See also
 Radio orchestra
 List of radio orchestras

References

External links

 Official website of the NHK Symphony Orchestra, Tokyo

Japanese orchestras
Musical groups established in 1926
Radio and television orchestras
1926 establishments in Japan
Musical groups from Tokyo
NHK
Symphony orchestras